Ernst Otto Borchmann is a German rower who competed for the SC Dynamo Berlin / Sportvereinigung (SV) Dynamo. He won medals at international rowing competitions.

References

External links
 

Living people
Year of birth missing (living people)
East German male rowers
World Rowing Championships medalists for East Germany
European Rowing Championships medalists